Gmina Dębowiec may refer to either of the following rural administrative districts in Poland:
Gmina Dębowiec, Silesian Voivodeship
Gmina Dębowiec, Subcarpathian Voivodeship